Richard Christopher Wakeman  (born 18 May 1949) is an English keyboardist and composer best known as a former member of the progressive rock band Yes across five tenures between 1971 and 2004, and for his solo albums released in the 1970s. AllMusic describes Wakeman as a "classically trained keyboardist extraordinaire who plied his trade with Yes and developed his own brand of live spectacular in a solo act."

Born and raised in West London, Wakeman quit his studies at the Royal College of Music in 1969 to become a full-time session musician. His early sessions included "Space Oddity", among other tracks, for David Bowie, and songs by Elton John, Marc Bolan, Cat Stevens, and Lou Reed. In 1970 Wakeman joined the folk rock group The Strawbs but left in the following year to join Yes, with whom he played on some of their most influential albums across two stints until 1980. During this time Wakeman began a solo career in 1973 and became an iconic and prominent figure in progressive rock. His highest-selling and most critically-acclaimed albums are his first three: The Six Wives of Henry VIII (1973), the UK number-one Journey to the Centre of the Earth (1974), and The Myths and Legends of King Arthur and the Knights of the Round Table (1975), all concept albums. In 1974 he formed his band, The English Rock Ensemble, with which he toured worldwide and continues to perform, and went on to score his first major film, Lisztomania (1975).

Wakeman had uneven success in the next two decades following a change in musical fashion and financial issues from two divorces. His most popular album was the conceptual rocker 1984 (1981), which was followed by the minor pop hit single "Glory Boys" from Silent Nights (1985). He expanded into other areas such as hosting the television show Gastank, composing for television and film, forming record labels, and producing his first New-age, ambient, and Christian music with Country Airs (1986) and The Gospels (1987), respectively. In 1989 he reunited with former Yes bandmates for Anderson Bruford Wakeman Howe, which led to his third period in the group until 1992. Wakeman's most significant album of the 1990s was Return to the Centre of the Earth (1999), his first UK Top 40 album in 18 years, and his piano album Piano Portraits (2017) produced his first UK Top 10 album since 1975. Starting in 2009, Wakeman revisited his three hit albums of the 1970s by performing them live with new and expanded arrangements. From 2016 to 2020, Wakeman was a member of Yes Featuring Jon Anderson, Trevor Rabin, Rick Wakeman. He continues to record albums and perform concerts worldwide in various capacities; his most recent album is A Gallery of the Imagination (2022).

Wakeman's discography includes over 90 solo albums spanning a range of musical styles. He has also gained notoriety for his appearances on the television programs Live at Jongleurs, Countdown, Grumpy Old Men, and Watchdog, and for his radio show on Planet Rock that aired from 2005 to 2010. Wakeman has written an autobiography and two memoirs. In 2017, he was inducted into the Rock and Roll Hall of Fame as a member of Yes. He was awarded a CBE for his services to music and broadcasting in 2021.

Early life
Wakeman was born on 18 May 1949 in Perivale, Middlesex. The only child of Cyril Frank Wakeman and Mildred Helen Wakeman (née Eastment), the three lived in Wood End Gardens in nearby Northolt. Cyril was a pianist in Ted Heath's big band while he was in the army, and worked at a building suppliers, joining as an office boy at fourteen to become one of its directors. Mildred worked at a removals firm. Wakeman attended Drayton Manor Grammar School in Hanwell, in 1959. The family spent their summer holidays in Exmouth.

When Wakeman turned seven, his father paid for weekly piano lessons with Dorothy Symes which lasted for eleven years. She recalled that Wakeman "passed everything with a distinction" and was an "enjoyable pupil to teach, full of fun and with a good sense of humour", but noted his lack of self-discipline when it came to practising. In 1960, Symes entered Wakeman in his first music competition and he went on to win many awards, certificates, and cups in contests held around London. Wakeman then took up the clarinet at age twelve and in his teenage years, attended church and learned the church organ, became a Sunday school teacher, and chose to be baptised at eighteen.

Wakeman described himself at school as "a horror ... I worked hard in the first year, then eased up". In 1961, during his time at Drayton Manor school, Wakeman played in his first band, the trad jazz outfit Brother Wakeman and the Clergymen, with a uniform of the school shirt put on the wrong way round. In 1963, at fourteen, Wakeman joined the Atlantic Blues, a local blues group that secured a year's residency at a mental health rehabilitation club in Neasden. Two years later, Wakeman passed his O Levels in English, maths, art and music, and went on to study music, art, and British constitution at A-level. In 1966, he joined the Concordes, later known as the Concorde Quartet, playing dance and pop songs at local events with his cousin Alan Wakeman on saxophone and clarinet. Wakeman used the money earned from their gigs to buy a Hohner Pianet, his first electronic instrument.

That year he also formed a dance band called the Green Dolphin Trio, spending a year's residency at a social club in Alperton, and Curdled Milk, a joke on "Strange Brew" by Cream, to play at the annual school dance. The band were unpaid after Wakeman lost control of his car and drove across the headmaster's rose garden at the front of the school, thereby forfeiting their performance fee to pay for the damage. In 1967, Wakeman began a tenure with the Ronnie Smith Band, a dance group based at the Top Rank ballroom in Watford. He was sacked in the following year after not taking the dance music seriously enough, but was reinstated and performed in Reading. It was there where he met their singer Ashley Holt, who later sang on many of Wakeman's future albums and tours.

In 1968, Wakeman secured a place at the Royal College of Music in London, studying the piano, clarinet, orchestration, and modern music, with the intention of becoming a concert pianist. To enter he needed to pass eight music exams to earn his A-level in the subject, which required him, as his mother remembered, "to do two years' work in ten months". Wakeman put in the effort following a ten shilling bet with his music teacher who believed he would not succeed, and refusing his father's offer to work with him. Wakeman joined the Royal College on a performers course before a change to the teachers course, but quickly found out that "everyone else there was at least as good as me; and a lot of them much better." He adopted a more relaxed attitude to his studies, spending much of his time drinking in pubs and with the staff at the Musical Bargain Centre, a music shop in Ealing.

Wakeman's first booking as a session musician, and his first time in a recording studio, occurred when guitarist Chas Cronk entered the shop one morning in need of an organist and brass arranger for members of the Ike & Tina Turner band. During the session Wakeman met producers Tony Visconti, Gus Dudgeon, and Denny Cordell Cordell was impressed with his performance and offered him more session work for artists at Regal Zonophone Records, which Wakeman accepted and he began skipping college in favour of sessions.

Career

1969–1971: Session work, The Strawbs, and joining Yes

Wakeman became a full-time session musician, playing keyboards and arranging music for various artists between fifteen and eighteen times a week. His ability to produce what was needed in a short amount of time led to his nickname, One Take Wakeman. Among his first sessions were playing on Battersea Power Station by Junior's Eyes and, in June 1969, the Mellotron on "Space Oddity" by David Bowie for a £9 fee after Dudgeon needed a player, as neither knew much about the instrument. Wakeman went on to play on several tracks on Bowie's second album, David Bowie, and organ and piano on American singer Tucker Zimmerman's only single, "Red Wind". Wakeman left the Ronnie Smith group and, for several months, played in a band named Spinning Wheel in a pub in Ilford for seven nights a week. He got the gig from an advert in Melody Maker. In one session, Visconti had Wakeman play a single bass note on the piano at the end of "Walk on Guilded Splinters" by Marsha Hunt, so he could be paid the session fee. In 1970, Wakeman performed on Seasons by Magna Carta, and records by Brotherhood of Man, Paper Bubble, Shawn Phillips, and White Plains. He soon became disillusioned with session work, despite being paid well, because he was not involved in the songwriting.

Wakeman's prominence rose during his tenure with the folk rock group The Strawbs. He had played the piano as a session musician on Dragonfly (1970), which was the first album released with Wakeman's name on its credits, and joined the band as a full-time member in March 1970. The group then performed a series of dates in Paris for a rock and roll circus with various bands backing the circus acts. During one performance, Wakeman pushed Salvador Dalí off the stage as he made a special guest appearance during his piano solo. He wrote, "I didn't know who he was. I thought, 'Silly old sod, coming on the stage waving his stick'." Wakeman's first major show with The Strawbs followed on 11 July 1970 at the Queen Elizabeth Hall in London, which was recorded and released as Just a Collection of Antiques and Curios. It features Wakeman playing an extended organ solo and his solo piano piece "Temperament of Mind", which received a standing ovation. The piece originated from improvisations when the band would lose power during a show, leaving Wakeman to fill time by playing the piano. The concert and album led to Wakeman being named "pop find of 1970" and was featured on the front page of Melody Maker for the first time, where he was named "tomorrow's superstar". Also in July 1970, Wakeman launched a folk music night at the White Hart in Acton called the Booze Droop. It failed to make an impact, so Bowie agreed to perform an acoustic set for £5 to help raise funds. The gig was attended by around 12 people.

While in the Strawbs, Wakeman continued to fit in session work to help pay for his new home in West Harrow. He bought a Minimoog synthesiser at half price from actor Jack Wild, who thought that it was defective because it only played one note at a time. Wakeman played the piano on "Morning Has Broken" by Cat Stevens for his 1971 album, Teaser and the Firecat. He was omitted from the credits, and for many years, was not paid; Stevens later apologised and compensated Wakeman for the error. Other sessions that involved Wakeman during this time were three tracks on Madman Across the Water by Elton John, and "Changes", "Oh! You Pretty Things", and "Life on Mars?" for Bowie's album Hunky Dory. Bowie invited Wakeman to his home and played the outline of the tracks for him to learn; Wakeman later called them "the finest selection of songs I have ever heard in one sitting in my entire life". Wakeman also later reflected, "David was incredibly influential to me. I learned more about how to work in a studio from David than anybody. He was tremendous in that respect." He also developed music for the 1972 film, Zee and Co. In late 1971, an album compiled of pop tunes played by Wakeman on the piano was released as Piano Vibrations by Polydor Records. Wakeman did not receive any royalties from it; he was paid £36 for the four sessions it took to make.

From the Witchwood marked the growing differences between Wakeman and The Strawbs; he made the better paid studio sessions a priority and contributed little to the band's new music. With his income from the group failing to cover his mortgage and bills, in July 1971 Wakeman became faced with "one of the most difficult decisions" of his career after Bowie invited him to join his new backing band, The Spiders from Mars. Later the same day, he received a call from bassist Chris Squire of the progressive rock group Yes, who explained that Yes needed a keyboardist as Tony Kaye had been asked to leave, following his resistance to learn instruments other than the piano and organ. Wakeman agreed to meet Yes as they rehearsed for their fourth album, Fragile (1971), and during his first tryout with the band, the basis of "Heart of the Sunrise" and "Roundabout" were put together. Thinking that Yes presented more favourable opportunities for his career, Wakeman declined Bowie's offer and played his final gig with The Strawbs. Wakeman reappeared on the front cover of Melody Maker, his second in a year, regarding his arrival in Yes. His earnings increased from £18 to £50 per week.

1971–1974: First Yes run, The Six Wives of Henry VIII, and Journey to the Centre of the Earth
Yes made Fragile in five weeks, partly to resume touring quickly so they could finance a new set of keyboards for Wakeman. The album features a solo track written by each member; Wakeman's track, "Cans and Brahms", is an adaptation of the third movement of Symphony No. 4 by Johannes Brahms played on electronic keyboards. He called it "dreadful" as contractual disputes between Atlantic Records, who had signed Yes, and A&M prevented him from writing his own composition. Wakeman claimed he was never credited for his contributions on Fragile, including piano sections on "Heart of the Sunrise" and "South Side of the Sky", despite being told that management would sort the issue. He enjoyed the music too much to cause further rifts. Fragile reached the top ten in the UK and the US, and the Fragile Tour marked Wakeman's first visit to North America. During the tour he signed a five album deal with A&M Records as a solo artist. The commercial success of Fragile allowed Wakeman to buy a new home in Gerrards Cross and start a car collection, which he rented out through his new business, the Fragile Carriage Company. In late 1971, Wakeman played two notable sessions, on "It Ain't Easy" on Bowie's album The Rise and Fall of Ziggy Stardust and the Spiders from Mars and on Orange by Al Stewart.

In the 1972 Melody Maker readers' poll, Wakeman ranked second in the Top Keyboardist category behind Keith Emerson. That year, Yes followed Fragile with Close to the Edge which is considered a landmark progressive rock album and features Wakeman playing a church organ and harpsichord. He is credited on the final track, "Siberian Khatru". Wakeman picked the album as "one of the finest moments of Yes's career." The Close to the Edge Tour marked the first time Wakeman wore a cape on stage after a fan offered his own for one of the band members to wear. He then had his own made; the first was made of sequins and cost US$300. Wakeman is featured on the concert film Yessongs, filmed in 1972 at the Rainbow Theatre which features his solo spot in the show. Also that month at the venue, Wakeman was a guest musician at The Who's orchestral performances of Tommy.

In January 1973, Wakeman released his debut solo album, The Six Wives of Henry VIII. It was recorded in 1972 during gaps in touring and recording with Yes, and features members of the band, the Strawbs, and other guest musicians. The album is instrumental with its concept based on Wakeman's musical interpretations of the characteristics of the six wives of Henry VIII. The album was previewed with Wakeman performing excerpts on the BBC television show, The Old Grey Whistle Test. Much of the television audience that night planned to watch Blue Movie, a controversial film by Andy Warhol, but it was temporarily banned from being broadcast. Wakeman explained: "It seems most of them, rather than watch repeats, switched over to Whistle Test and saw my preview of Henry ... and suddenly it seemed as if the whole country had discovered my music ... it was a tremendous break." The album reached No. 7 in the UK and No. 30 in the US, and Time named the record one of the best albums of the year. At the Melody Maker readers poll awards in September 1973, Wakeman came out first in the top keyboardist category.

Yes's double concept album Tales from Topographic Oceans was released in November 1973, containing four side long pieces based on ideas from Hindu scriptures in Autobiography of a Yogi by Paramahansa Yogananda. Wakeman had doubts about its esoteric concept, and felt a lot of its music was too experimental which required further rehearsal. He distanced himself from the group, and spent time in the bar at Morgan Studios and played on "Sabbra Caddabra" on Sabbath Bloody Sabbath by Black Sabbath in the adjacent studio. Yes toured the album for six months, playing the album in its entirety which Wakeman also disagreed with. He openly criticised the album to the press, and his growing frustrations culminated in an incident whereby he ate a curry on stage during a show in Manchester. In 2006, Wakeman clarified that his total dislike of the album is "not entirely true" and recognises some "very, very nice musical moments", but "we had too much for a single album but not enough for a double, so we padded it out and the padding is awful".

During the Topographic Oceans tour Wakeman recorded his new 40-minute work Journey to the Centre of the Earth, based on Jules Verne's same-titled science-fiction novel. He came up with the idea in 1971, but shelved the project until The Six Wives of Henry VIII was complete. After working on the music with Lou Reizner, David Measham, Wil Malone, and Danny Beckerman, which features an orchestra, choir, and a rock band, Wakeman chose to record the piece in concert due to the high costs of a studio. To help finance the project, he sold some of his cars and "mortgage[d himself] up to the hilt", all of which cost around £40,000. Two concerts were held at London's Royal Festival Hall on 18 January 1974 with the London Symphony Orchestra, the English Chamber Choir, actor David Hemmings as narrator, and a five-piece band formed of musicians that Wakeman played with in a west London pub: vocalists Ashley Holt and Gary Pickford-Hopkins, drummer Barney James, bassist Roger Newell, and guitarist Mike Egan. A&M wanted to use better known musicians, but Wakeman wanted the album to be known for its music rather than the performers. After cutting the album A&M refused to sell it, but as Wakeman was under contract with its US division, a cassette was sent to co-founder Jerry Moss who liked it and ordered its worldwide release.

After touring Topographic Oceans, Wakeman retreated to his Devonshire home. He heard early ideas for Yes's next album, felt he could no longer contribute to the style of music they were making, and confirmed his departure from the band on his twenty-fifth birthday. Later that day, A&M informed him that Journey had entered the UK charts at No. 1, a first for the label. Journey also reached No. 3 in the US, and earned Wakeman a Grammy and Ivor Novello Award nomination. The album has sold an estimated 14 million copies worldwide. On 27 July 1974, Wakeman headlined the Crystal Palace Garden Party concert, performing selections from Six Wives and Journey in its entirety. By this time, his excessive smoking and alcohol consumption, a lack of sleep five days prior to the show, and a wrist injury from a fall, took a toll on his health, and he needed morphine injections to get through the performance. Soon after the show, he suffered a minor heart attack.

1974–1980: King Arthur, No Earthly Connection, and second Yes run
During his recovery at Wexham Park Hospital, Wakeman started to write new music for his next album, The Myths and Legends of King Arthur and the Knights of the Round Table. Despite being advised to reduce his workload and improve his excessive lifestyle, Wakeman made plans to record and tour and continued to smoke and drink. In September and October 1974, he completed his debut North American tour, performing Journey to the Centre of the Earth plus selections from Six Wives with the National Philharmonic Orchestra, the Choir of America, and his rock band named The English Rock Ensemble. Under doctors' orders, Wakeman was required to pass a heart monitor test before each performance. The tour continued to Japan, Australia, and New Zealand, finishing in March 1975.

Recording for King Arthur finished in January 1975, and features the New World Orchestra, English Chamber Choir, and the Nottingham Festival Vocal Group. Its a concept album based on King Arthur and its related characters and stories. Following its release in March 1975, the album went to No. 2 in the UK and No. 21 in the US, and earned gold certifications in Brazil, Japan, and Australia. The album was promoted with three sold-out shows at Wembley Arena with Wakeman performing with an orchestra, choir, and his rock band to a total of 27,000 people. As the arena floor was already set up as an ice rink for a different attraction, Wakeman chose to present the show as an ice pageant with fourteen ice skaters and the musicians' stage placed in the round and decorated as a castle. The shows, though well received and a contributory factor to the album's commercial success, were expensive to produce. In 2009, the concerts were listed in ranked 79th on VH1's 100 Greatest Shocking Moments in Rock and Roll program. By 2008, the album had sold an estimated 12 million copies worldwide.

Wakeman toured King Arthur with an augmented formation of the English Rock Ensemble for three months from October 1975, across North and South America. The stage production was scaled back in comparison to his previous tours, featuring only his rock band with a two-piece wind section. The line-up was Wakeman's first with new drummer Tony Fernandez, who would perform on many of his future albums and tours. In 1975, Wakeman composed the soundtrack for Lisztomania, a biography film about composer Franz Liszt written and directed by Ken Russell. Wakeman appears in the film as Thor, the god of thunder. A few years later, he recalled the album in a more negative light as "there was hardly anything of mine on it in the end", and criticised its mixing and production. No Earthly Connection (1976) was recorded in France and features Wakeman and his English Rock Ensemble. Initially it was to be about mythological gods, but its lyrical subject matter changed after he witnessed a flying object one night which inspired him to read up on the origins of man and mysterious phenomena such as the Bermuda Triangle, Stonehenge, and the pyramids. Wakeman wrote the album without playing any of its music beforehand, and summarised it in the liner notes: "A futuristic, autobiographical look at music, the part it plays in our pre-earth, human and after life". Upon its release in April 1976, the album went to No. 9 in the UK and No. 67 in the US. Wakeman toured the album worldwide for seven weeks, which featured a scaled down stage production compared to his previous tours.

By the summer of 1976, Wakeman fell into financial trouble after touring had met its minimal expectations and its expenses had exceeded its profits, and had to come up with £350,000 "in a matter of weeks". He sold his Rolls-Royces, ended his Fragile car service company, and disbanded the English Rock Ensemble, and saw further relief when A&M agreed to pay royalties in advance. At the suggestion of Wakeman's his manager, Brian Lane, Wakeman rehearsed with Bill Bruford and John Wetton for six weeks with the plan to form a new band, but the story broke in Melody Maker which effectively caused the group to split. Wakeman took up work recording the soundtrack to White Rock, a documentary film about the 1976 Winter Olympics directed by Tony Maylam. The film premiered in February 1977 as a double bill with Genesis: In Concert. The track "After the Ball" was one that Wakeman forgot to write; he proceeded to play it as a completely improvised single take, rather than confessing to the producers.

Wakeman's fortunes changed when he was invited to join Yes in Montreux, Switzerland, as they were working on new songs for Going for the One (1977), in November 1976. Keyboardist Patrick Moraz had left during the early stages in part due to the "enormous psychological pressures within the group". Upon hearing the band's new material of more accessible and concise songs, Wakeman agreed to play on the album as a session musician and joined the band in Montreux. Wakeman subsequently agreed to rejoin the band full-time, but noticed the new edition of Melody Maker had printed the headline "Wakeman rejoins Yes" hours after he agreed. He then learned that Lane had informed the press of his return without consulting him. Wakeman described Going for the One as "the album Yes should have made instead of Topographic Oceans", and considered the 15-minute track "Awaken" as one of the group's best. Tormato (1978) features Wakeman playing a Birotron, a tape replay keyboard that used 8-track tape cartridges and contributed funds to its development. He is reported to have given the album its name by throwing a tomato at a showing of the art used for the album's cover.

Wakeman's final albums for A&M were released in the late 1970s. Rick Wakeman's Criminal Record (1977) is an instrumental rock album (apart from humorous vocals from Bill Oddie) similar to The Six Wives of Henry VIII but loosely based on criminality, and features Yes bandmates Chris Squire on bass and Alan White on drums, with Frank Ricotti on percussion. The album went to No. 25 in the UK and No. 128 in the US. The track "Birdman of Alcatraz" was used as the theme music to the BBC drama series My Son, My Son and subsequently released as a single. Rhapsodies (1979) was recorded in Montreux and released as a double album, with Wakeman playing shorter tracks of varied musical styles. It features Bruce Lynch, Frank Gibson Jr., and Tony Visconti as guest musicians. It also peaked at No. 25 in the UK. After touring with Yes in 1979, and failed attempts at making a new album with the band in Paris and London, Wakeman and Anderson left the group in early 1980.

1980–1988: Albums for Charisma and President Records and venture into New-age and Christian music
In 1980, after a four-year hiatus, Wakeman reformed the English Rock Ensemble for a European tour. Later that year he came close to forming a band with drummer Carl Palmer, bassist John Wetton, and guitarist Trevor Rabin, but opted out "on a matter of principle" as the record company was prepared to sign them without hearing any of the group's music. He looked back at this moment: "I basically sealed my financial fate, and things went downhill fast." His father's death in November 1980 prompted him to leave Switzerland and return to the UK, which led to a record deal with Charisma Records to avoid bankruptcy. For several months of 1980 Wakeman was homeless due to his financial difficulties and second divorce, and resorted to sleeping on benches in Kensington Gardens until a former roadie let him sleep at his house.

Wakeman's first album for Charisma was 1984, a concept rock album based on George Orwell's same-titled dystopian novel, with a band including Steve Barnacle on bass, Gary Barnacle on saxophone, and Frank Ricotti on drums. The album features tracks with Chaka Khan, Jon Anderson, Kenny Lynch, and Tim Rice on lead vocals, who also wrote the lyrics. 1984 was released in June 1981 and reached number 24 in the UK. Plans to have the album adapted into a musical were cancelled after lawyers from Orwell's estate blocked its development. In July 1981, Wakeman performed Journey to the Centre of the Earth for two shows in Durban, South Africa. This was followed by a world tour until the end of 1981, with a line-up of Holt, Fernandez, Tim Stone on guitar, Steve Barnacle on bass, and Cori Josiah on vocals. The tour became problematic due to growing friction within the band. In the same year, Wakeman recorded the soundtrack to the slasher horror film The Burning in New York City.

Wakeman's next album was Rock 'n' Roll Prophet, a humorous spoof on the pop duo The Buggles released in 1982 on his own label, Moon Records. Initially titled Maybe '80, it was recorded in Switzerland in 1979 but remained unreleased until he secured the rights for it following an appearance at the MIDEM music festival. A single from the album, "I'm So Straight I'm a Weirdo", featuring Wakeman on lead vocals, was released in 1980. Wakeman hosted the Channel 4 music show Gastank with Tony Ashton that aired in January and February 1983. He then released a second album for Charisma, Cost of Living, a mixture of instrumental and rock tracks with Rice on vocals, which failed to impact the chart and "did nothing" to improve his finances. By this time, Wakeman was "managerless, penniless and homeless". In February 1983, he and Carter moved to Camberley, Surrey after the birth of their daughter Jemma. Wakeman took up work by recording the soundtrack to the official 1982 FIFA World Cup documentary film G'olé!, which was released around the same time as Cost of Living which hampered potential sales. He wrote the soundtrack for the film She with assistance from Justin Hayward and Maggie Bell, and his second Russell feature, Crimes of Passion, with Bell on vocals, Fernandez on drums, and past Strawbs bandmate Chas Cronk on bass. Wakeman based the music around the themes of Symphony No. 9 by Antonín Dvořák. Wakeman also spent early 1983 writing the score to the ballet Killing Games, but problems during its development led to the project being shelved, along with a potential double album of its music. In early 1984, Wakeman contributed three songs to the soundtrack of B.C. Rock.

In 1984, Wakeman signed with the independent label President Records in an association that would last until 2007, for which he would produce almost 40 albums. The first was Silent Nights, Wakeman's first solo album in over two years, featuring Fernandez, Cronk, and Rick Fenn on guitar and released in 1985. The single "Glory Boys" became a minor pop hit in the UK. In March 1985, Wakeman finished work on his part of the soundtrack to the comedy film Playing for Keeps, which was followed by a tour of the UK, North America, and Australia to promote Silent Nights. It was his first full-scale tour in four years, and his first shows in the US in over five. A live album from the UK leg was released as Live at Hammersmith. The tour left Wakeman "seriously in debt", and he was forced to remortgage his Camberley home. In September 1985, during the tour's Australian leg, Wakeman fell ill from his alcoholism and has been teetotal since. Also in 1985, a single of Wakeman's theme tunes for the television shows Lytton's Diary and Database was released. By this time he had also composed music for the BBC show Paddles Up and the Channel 4 documentary Supercat. Wakeman reunited with David Bowie to play the piano on his 1986 single "Absolute Beginners".

The latter half of the 1980s saw Wakeman venture into new musical genres. In 1986, he released his first album of new age music titled Country Airs, formed of solo piano tracks inspired by the countryside. It reached number one on the UK new age chart. Wakeman followed this with a tour of the Far East, and soundtrack work for Hero, the film to the 1986 World Cup, and the BBC film The Day After the Fair. In 1987, Wakeman joined the rock band Sky as a guest musician for an Australian tour, and released The Family Album consisting of new age tracks dedicated to each of his family members and pets. The original pressing included music Wakeman wrote for the TV film The Day After the Fair and the feature documentary Mackintosh. Also in 1987, Wakeman put out his first of several Christian music albums titled The Gospels, a double album based on the four Gospels that features tenor vocalist Ramon Remedios, actor Robert Powell as narrator, and the Eton College Chapel Choir. The music was originally written for a 1985 concert as part of a fund raising event for a church before it was expanded into a full album. Wakeman played the album with Remedios and his band in at the Royal Albert Hall in London and in the following year, in Caesarea, Israel. He returned to rock with Time Machine, loosely based on the science fiction novel by H. G. Wells and featuring Roy Wood and Tracy Ackerman as guest vocalists. Released in 1988, Wakeman intended to record it with an orchestra and choir and put on a star-studded ice show, but the idea was cancelled due to lack of funds.

In March 1988, in a move to improve their finances, Wakeman and Carter sold their Camberley home and moved to Peel on the Isle of Man. A coach house on the site of their home was converted into a recording studio that Wakeman named Bajonor Studios, named after the first letters of his family. The 24-track studio was built as Wakeman had lost several opportunities to score films due to the high cost of renting large, professional studios, so he built his own as a compromise. Wakeman recorded there from 1990 until 2001. The new age-themed Aspirant Sunset, released in 1990, was the first, and marks the first album with his longtime recording engineer Stuart Sawney. Wakeman donated 50p from every sale of the Aspirant album trilogy to CPRE, The Countryside Charity. Wakeman befriended fellow Isle of Man resident Norman Wisdom, and the two made an album together.

1988–1997: ABWH, third and fourth Yes runs, Phantom Power, and The Piano Album
In late 1988, Wakeman got together with former Yes bandmates Jon Anderson, Bill Bruford, and Steve Howe to form a new group, Anderson Bruford Wakeman Howe. The band originated when Anderson had become increasingly frustrated with Yes's commercial direction, and left the band to make music that reflected the band's 1970s sound. Their self-titled album was released in 1989, and the tour marked Wakeman's first major US tour in ten years. Tracks originally put down for a second album were added to an in-progress Yes album and released as Union in 1991, which transformed Yes into an eight-piece formation with Wakeman sharing keyboards with original Yes member Tony Kaye. Wakeman has openly stated his dislike for Union, partly due to the fact that session musicians were brought in to re-write and perform parts that he and Howe had already put down. However, he later chose the Union Tour tour of 1991–1992 as his favourite with Yes, where he formed a strong friendship with their 1980s guitarist and singer-songwriter Trevor Rabin. Wakeman confirmed his exit from the group in 1993 following managerial disputes with the band's and his own.

Wakeman continued with his solo career in parallel; in 1990 he revived his English Rock Ensemble with Holt, Fernandez, and Paton for a European tour and recorded a new rock score for a colourised re-release of The Phantom of the Opera, featuring Chrissie Hammond on vocals, put out as Phantom Power in 1991. He embarked on two UK tours supporting his two The Classical Connection albums with himself and Paton in a stripped back stage production. In the first half of the 1990s, Wakeman performed and released music in aid of ASSIST, a California-based Christian organisation founded by journalist Dan Wooding, author of Wakeman's biography. The pair reconnected in 1989, and their first venture was In the Beginning, an album of atmospheric music with Biblical readings ready by Wakeman's then-wife Nina. Wakeman donated the album's entire proceedings to ASSIST. In 1994, Wakeman completed the Simply Acoustic Tour, a series of solo piano concerts in the US in aid of ASSIST. Recordings from shows in Virginia and the Calvary Chapel in Costa Mesa, California was released on The Piano Album in 1995. The latter show was attended by 8,000 people. Wakeman formed Hope Records to release this new Christian music, and decided to use the royalty payments to fund the production of more albums for the label.

In October 1992, Wakeman embarked on a world tour with a four-piece group of Fernandez, guitarist and bassist Alan Thomson, and his son Adam Wakeman on additional keyboards. The tour lasted until 1994, and was organised as Wakeman wished to tour with a second keyboardist to "free [him] up to do more things" on stage. The tour marked the release of Wakeman with Wakeman, an album of keyboard compositions written and performed by the pair. They released No Expense Spared in 1993, Romance of the Victorian Age in 1994, and Vignettes in 1996. In 1993, Wakeman's financial situation took an unexpected turn when he was demanded to pay almost £70,000 to the Inland Revenue for interest charges and unpaid penalties related to tax he had paid for the preceding six years. He later wrote: "With help from Brian Lane's office and Yes's accountants, in my signing away all publishing income from everything I had ever written ... Twenty-two years' work had vanished in the three seconds it had taken to sign my name." Wakeman credits his 1993 appearance on the evening talk show Danny Baker After All as a turning point in his television career, after he told a story about being arrested in Moscow for smuggling a KGB uniform out of the country.

In mid-1995, Wakeman became involved with Phillip Gandey's family circus entertainment project Cirque Surreal, writing and recording "timeless" pieces to enhance the show's various characters. The show was initially held at the Brighton Festival, and Wakeman went out to perform it live with his band at other venues, including the Cheltenham Festival. Around the same time, Wakeman scored the soundtrack to Bullet to Beijing, a made-for-television film starring Michael Caine and Jason Connery. He also scoreed its sequel, Midnight in Saint Petersburg. Also in 1995, Wakeman played keyboards on Ozzy Osbourne's album Ozzmosis.

In the summer of 1995, Wakeman agreed to return to Yes which marked his fourth time in the group and the return of the "classic" line-up. They worked on new studio material and performed live shows in 1996 which was released on Keys to Ascension (1996) and Keys to Ascension 2 (1997). In March 1997, Wakeman staged the North American premiere of The New Gospels for five dates after it was reworked and extended into a two-hour oratorio with a 30-piece choir, in 1994. The concerts were free with donations to ASSIST. Wakeman left Yes in May 1997 before he could tour with them, due to scheduling conflicts and lack of coordination between the artists' management. In June 1997, Wakeman became the host of the stand-up comedy television show Live at Jongleurs. Later in 1997, his 20-minute choral piece "Noah", written for the English Chamber Choir, premiered in London. Wakeman performed the piece with the choir once more in 2011.

1998–2008: Return to the Centre of the Earth, English Rock Ensemble revival, and final Yes run
In 1998, he started work on Return to the Centre of the Earth, a sequel album to commemorate the 25th anniversary of Journey to the Centre of the Earth. The idea first came to Wakeman in 1991 during a tour of Italy, which led to discussions about the project with Atlantic Records that year about a re-recording of the original album with new equipment and arrangements, but the idea was rejected. It was revived in 1996 when Wakeman received offers from three record companies willing to fund and release a new "epic" album. After a deal with EMI Classics was made, a story based on three unnamed travellers and their attempt to follow the original route was finalised, and recording began in 1998 with a band, the London Symphony Orchestra, the English Chamber Choir, Patrick Stewart as the narrator, and guest performances from Trevor Rabin, Ozzy Osbourne, and Bonnie Tyler. Released in 1999, the album went to number 34 in the UK, Wakeman's first album to enter the chart in 12 years. Recording was temporarily disrupted because of Wakeman's health. In December 1998, Wakeman was featured on an episode of This Is Your Life.

Wakeman accepted an invitation to revive his English Rock Ensemble for a South American tour in September 2000, following a renewed interest in progressive rock there. The band featured a new line-up of Fernandez, Damian Wilson on vocals, Adam Wakeman on keyboards, Ant Glynne on guitar, and Lee Pomeroy on bass. Wakeman was particularly pleased with his playing, calling it his "best in a long time." The group returned in April 2001, followed by several European dates. Later that year, Wakeman entered discussions with Keith Emerson regarding a potential music project, but the idea was shelved. In 2001, Wakeman performed in his first pantomime role as Abanazar in a production of Aladdin in Truro, for the Christmas season. He made a cameo appearance in the 2002 thriller horror film Alone as a hospital patient. In 2003, Wakeman starred in the BBC television show Grumpy Old Men, and stayed on as a regular until the show ended in 2006. The show increased his national profile and made him a regular in the after dinner speech circuit.

In April 2002, Wakeman rejoined Yes for the fifth and final time, and said it took eight months to get the necessary paperwork to make it happen. The band toured worldwide with the Full Circle Tour and 35th Anniversary Tours, which ran from 2002 to 2004. Wakeman described the band's playing during his return: "It was far and away the best the band had ever been ... there was no staleness, there was a lot of freshness." The only new studio material worked on during this time were bonus tracks on The Ultimate Yes: 35th Anniversary Collection. After the 2004 tour Yes entered a four-year hiatus, during which Wakeman retired from large scale tours following ongoing health problems. When the band regrouped in 2008, Wakeman's son Oliver replaced him on keyboards.

In April 2005, Wakeman and his band performed three shows in Havana, Cuba, including an outdoor show attended by an estimated 10,000 people. They came about after Wakeman was offered to perform there to support a charitable foundation that supports a children's cancer hospital. The first two shows were filmed and released as Made in Cuba, proceeds from which were given to the hospital. Cuban leader Fidel Castro greeted Wakeman, thanking him for his humanitarian support. Wakeman received some criticism following the visit, which upset him personally and made him consider retiring from live performance. He addressed the false accusations on his website, clarifying that the visit was not staged for political reasons. Wakeman later revealed that Castro gave him some earth surrounding Che Guevara's grave. In June 2006, Wakeman toured the US with a solo piano tour. This was followed by a performance of Return to the Centre of the Earth with his band, orchestra, and choir in Quebec, Canada. The show featured Jon Anderson as a guest performer, which led to the pair touring the UK together as Anderson/Wakeman. Wakeman toured the UK in 2007 with a new production, the Grumpy Old Picture Show. Inspired by his appearances on Grumpy Old Men, the show combined live performances and stories with visual accompaniments including old photos and pre-recorded sketches. The initial run of 14 dates were so successful, Wakeman completed a further 24 dates in the following year.

2009–present: Revisiting classic 1970s albums, Yes feat. ARW, and piano albums
In May 2009, Wakeman performed his debut album The Six Wives of Henry VIII in its entirety for the first time at Hampton Court Palace, as part of the 500th anniversary celebrations of Henry VIII's assesion to the throne. He had originally asked to perform there in 1973, but was declined until he was invited 36 years later. The shows were released on CD and DVD as The Six Wives of Henry VIII Live at Hampton Court Palace. In 2010, Wakeman was awarded the Spirit of Prog Award at the annual Classic Rock Roll of Honour Awards.

In 2012, Wakeman recorded a new and extended version of Journey to the Centre of the Earth, following the discovery of the original conductor's score three years prior which was considered lost. As the original album was shortened to fit a single LP, Wakeman re-recorded the album with the previously cut parts which expanded the work to 54 minutes. It features his English Rock Ensemble, the Orion Orchestra and English Chamber Choir conducted by Guy Protheroe, and narration by actor Peter Egan. In April and May 2014, Wakeman performed the expanded album on a 14-date UK tour to commemorate the fortieth anniversary of the original. The re-recording of Journey became the catalyst for a new and expanded version of King Arthur, following a request from a South American concert promoter, for which Wakeman wrote new music based on additional Arthurian legends. The re-record version runs for 88 minutes, and features actor Ian Lavender as narrator. It was Wakeman's first album produced via online direct-to-fan support, and released on 19 June 2016, the same day that Wakeman performed it live at London's O2 Arena for the Stone Free Festival.

In 2013, Wakeman played on The Theory of Everything by Ayreon. In August 2013, Wakeman performed 12 solo piano shows as part of the Edinburgh Festival Fringe.

In January 2016, Wakeman, Anderson, and Trevor Rabin announced the formation of their new band, Anderson, Rabin and Wakeman (ARW). The three toured from 2016 to 2018, performing Yes music across the band's history. Also in January 2016, Wakeman performed a live piano version of "Life on Mars?" on BBC Radio 2 as a tribute following the death of his old friend David Bowie. The strong reception from listeners and viewers of the YouTube video led Wakeman to release a single of the track with a piano version of "Space Oddity" and an original song, "Always Together", in aid of Macmillan Cancer Support. The reception from the single and YouTube video inspired Wakeman to produce a solo piano album of tracks that he had played on in his career, plus original tunes and adaptations of classical pieces. Piano Portraits was released in January 2017 and peaked at No. 7 in the UK, Wakeman's highest-charting album since 1975. It also reached gold certification from the British Phonographic Institute. In 2018, Wakeman released a follow-up album, Piano Odyssey, which also reached No. 7 in the UK.

In September and October 2019, Wakeman embarked on his first solo tour of the US in 13 years, playing piano shows. This was followed by the release of Christmas Portraits, a Christmas-themed piano album. In 2020, Wakeman returned to his progressive rock roots with The Red Planet, an instrumental album inspired by Mars and features his English Rock Ensemble. His next album will be A Gallery of the Imagination, featuring tracks of varied styles including songs and instrumentals, set for release in 2022. Wakeman plans to have listeners produce artwork inspired by the music that will be displayed in a gallery, allowing visitors to hear the music as they walk around the exhibit.

In February 2023, Wakeman performed two shows at the London Palladium which included performances of The Six Wives of Henry VIII, Journey to the Centre of the Earth, King Arthur, and songs he performed with Yes.

Instruments

Although Wakeman is a noted player of the grand piano, electric piano, pipe organ, Hammond organ, Minimoog and many later models of synthesiser, he is well known as a proponent (for a time) of the Mellotron – an analogue electronic musical instrument that uses a bank of pre-recorded magnetic tape strips, each of which is activated by a separate key on its keyboard and lasts approximately 8 seconds. Wakeman featured playing this instrument, to varying degrees, on the David Bowie track "Space Oddity", the Yes albums Fragile, Close to the Edge and Tales From Topographic Oceans, as well as the solo albums The Six Wives of Henry VIII and White Rock. An urban legend claims that Wakeman got so frustrated with one Mellotron that he poured petrol on it and set fire to it, which he denied in a 2010 interview, but confirmed in a 2016 interview. He subsequently worked with David Biro to develop the Birotron, which used the then popular 8-track cassette format rather than tape strips. Because of the advent of digital keyboards at that time, and expensive components used in the instruments' manufacture, the Birotron was never a commercial or technical success. Only 35 Birotrons were produced. These days, he uses more modern instruments such as the Korg Kronos, Yamaha Montage, and the Memotron, a new digital version of the original Mellotron.

Recognition and influence
In his foreword for Wakeman's 1979 biography, Elton John named The Six Wives of Henry VIII as one of his favourite albums. He noted Wakeman's "brilliant" technique and wrote that his "mastery of electronic instruments only adds to his abilities". In 2011, MusicRadar included Wakeman among "The 27 greatest keyboard players of all time". In 2019, readers of Prog voted him the second greatest progressive rock keyboard player, with the magazine stating, "Wakeman's time with Yes helped define prog as we know it, being filled with timeless brilliance [...] The man's style is fluent, and underlines a love of many genres, all cohesively brought into focus."

Keyboardists who have cited Wakeman as an influence included Dave Greenfield of the Stranglers and Mark Kelly of Marillion, who cited Wakeman as his primary influence.

Personal life

Family
Wakeman has been married four times and has six children. At the age of 20, he married Rosaline Woolford on 28 March 1970 and had two sons, Oliver (b. 26 February 1972) and Adam (b. 11 March 1974). They divorced in 1977. Wakeman then married Swiss-born Danielle Corminboeuf, a recording studio secretary, in January 1980 in the West Indies and lived with her in Montreux. They had one son, Benjamin (b. 1978), before they divorced in late 1980. In 1981, Wakeman met former Page 3 model Nina Carter and had a daughter, Jemma Kiera (b. 1983), before they married in November 1984 and had a son, Oscar (b. 1986). The couple separated in 2000 and divorced in 2004.

In 2004, Wakeman revealed that he had had an extramarital affair with American-born designer Denise Gandrup, who first met Wakeman in 1972 and made several of his capes. After they split in 1981, they reconnected in 1985 and had one daughter, Amanda (b. 1986). Wakeman felt it best to keep the relationship and child secret to protect his family, but continued to financially support his daughter.

In December 2011, Wakeman married journalist Rachel Kaufman. They currently live in Diss, Norfolk.

Health
Wakeman has faced a number of health issues. In his twenties he suffered three heart attacks due to his unhealthy lifestyle of smoking and heavy drinking. The first two were minor and he was told they may have gone unnoticed. The third occurred soon after a performance of Journey to the Centre of the Earth at Crystal Palace Park in July 1974. Wakeman quit smoking in 1979.

In 1985, Wakeman's drinking led to cirrhosis of the liver and alcoholic hepatitis, and he has been teetotal since. In 1999, Wakeman collapsed on a golf course and was rushed to hospital, where he was diagnosed with a fatal case of double pneumonia, pleurisy, and showed signs of Legionnaire's disease. He was placed in an induced coma. At one point his doctors gave him just 24 hours to live. Wakeman has had a vasectomy.

In 2016, Wakeman announced he has type-2 diabetes and in 2023, said his playing is now affected by macular degeneration in his left eye and arthritis in his hands and feet. Wakeman has never used drugs, pills or cannabis, and believed he would have committed suicide at some point had he taken them, given his excesses with alcohol.

Other activities
In the 1970s, Wakeman met Queen Elizabeth The Queen Mother and bought Tropical Saint, a racehorse that belonged to her. After it died, he bought Balinloning, a small horse that he had in care for a year and entered in races. In 1979, he became a director of Brentford F.C., a post which he held for a year. In 1983, he became chairman of Camberley Town F.C.; he quit in 1987 due to his busy work schedule, but remained active as an honourary vice-president. In 2009, he became a patron of Tech Music Schools.

In the 1990s, Wakeman bought a house by Playa de la Vistas in Tenerife.

He had a renewal of his Christian faith which began at around the time of his 1984 marriage to Carter.

Wakeman is a supporter of the Conservative Party, saying he was "unique in [Yes] as a card-carrying Conservative".

In 1993, Wakeman was invited to play the piano at the inauguration of US President Bill Clinton. He declined due to unavailability.

Wakeman was one of the board of directors of the Performing Artists' Media Rights Association (PAMRA), a non-profit organisation committed to promoting musicians' rights and income.

In September 2005, Wakeman began a weekly three-hour radio show on Planet Rock called Rick's Place, broadcasting Saturday mornings. The show ended in December 2010. 
In late 2020, Wakeman launched Rick's Plaice, a subscription-based video series based on the format of his former Planet Rock show.

In 2007, Wakeman became a Freemason, joining the Chelsea Lodge No. 3098 which is made up of entertainers. His father was a member of the Brent Valley Lodge No. 3940, and the support that Wakeman and his mother received from his friends at the Lodge following his death was a catalyst for Wakeman to learn more about Freemasonry. In 2019, Wakeman was elected as an honorary member of his late father's Lodge. In 2011, Wakeman joined the Knights Templar fraternity, and is also a member of the Vaudeville Lodge. In 2014, he was installed as the 110th Worshipful Master of the Chelsea Lodge and elected as the 125th King Rat in the showbusiness fraternity and charity organisation, the Grand Order of Water Rats. Wakeman was the first person to hold both titles. He hosted the Grumpy Old Rockstar's Chelsea Lodge Ladies Festival in the following year. Wakeman appears in his Masonic apron in the 2017 documentary series Inside the Freemasons.

Wakeman is an honorary president of the Classic Rock Society, formed in Rotherham in 1991. In 1988 he was elected into the Lord's Taverners cricket charity, and was chairman of the Isle of Man branch with his wife in the early 1990s. In October 1997, Wakeman received a Golden Badge Award from the British Academy of Songwriters, Composers and Authors (BASCA), given for outstanding contributions to the British music and entertainment industry. In 2008, Wakeman gave a class to students of the London College of Music and later that year, received an honorary professorship from the college for his contributions to music. In 2012, Wakeman received an honorary fellowship of the Royal College of Music in a ceremony presented by HRH The Prince of Wales, the college's President. In 2022, he received the Musicians' Company Honorary Fellowship at the Royal College. Wakeman was appointed Commander of the Order of the British Empire (CBE) in the 2021 Birthday Honours for services to music and broadcasting.

In a 2010 interview, he was critical of Wikipedia, saying it has too many inaccuracies and mistakes, and that he would love to see it "closed down".

In June 2017, he was the castaway for the BBC Radio 4 programme Desert Island Discs. His favourite piece was Giuseppe Verdi's Anvil Chorus and his book choice was Principles of Orchestration by Nikolai Rimsky-Korsakov.

Wakeman's agent for TV and media work is entertainer Roger De Courcey, best known for performing with his puppet Nookie Bear.

Discography

Selected solo releases

Piano Vibrations (1971; unofficial)
The Six Wives of Henry VIII (1973)
Journey to the Centre of the Earth (1974; live)
The Myths and Legends of King Arthur and the Knights of the Round Table (1975)
No Earthly Connection (1976)
Rick Wakeman's Criminal Record (1977)
Rhapsodies (1979)
1984 (1981)
Cost of Living (1983)
Silent Nights (1985)
Time Machine (1988)
Sea Airs (1989)
Phantom Power (1990)
Night Airs (1990)
Classic Tracks (1993)
Rick Wakeman's Greatest Hits (1993)
Light Up The Sky (1994; EP)
The Seven Wonders of the World (1995)
Return to the Centre of the Earth (1999)
Piano Portraits (2017)
Piano Odyssey (2018)
Christmas Portraits (2019)
The Red Planet (2020)
A Gallery of the Imagination (2023)

Selected film scores

Lisztomania (1975)
White Rock (1977)
The Burning (1981)
G'olé! (1983)
Crimes of Passion (1984)
Creepshow 2 (1987; with Les Reed)
Phantom Power (1990)
 Bullet to Beijing (1995)
White Rock II (1999)

Bibliography
Books
Say Yes! An Autobiography (1995)
Grumpy Old Rockstar: and Other Wondrous Stories (2008)
Further Adventures of a Grumpy Old Rockstar (2010)

Songbooks
Criminal Record 
Journey to the Centre of the Earth
The Myths & Legends of King Arthur & the Knights of the Round Table
The Six Wives of Henry VIII

References

Sources

External links

Rick Wakeman's Communication Centre
Rick Wakeman's Official Press Photos
Rick Wakeman Interview NAMM Oral History Library (2013)

 
1949 births
Living people
20th-century British pianists
21st-century British pianists
21st-century organists
A&M Records artists
Alumni of the Royal College of Music
Anderson Bruford Wakeman Howe members
British male organists
British male pianists
Charisma Records artists
Commanders of the Order of the British Empire
Conservative Party (UK) people
EMI Records artists
English Christians
English classical pianists
English electronic musicians
English heavy metal keyboardists
English rock keyboardists
English rock pianists
English session musicians
English songwriters
Male classical pianists
Musicians from Wembley
People from Perivale
Progressive rock keyboardists
Progressive rock organists
Progressive rock pianists
Strawbs members
Television personalities from London
The Ozzy Osbourne Band members
Varèse Sarabande Records artists
Voiceprint Records artists
Yes (band) members